Andrew Dallas Duffey (December 16, 1842 June 24, 1919) served in the California State Assembly in the early 20th century for the 54th district.

Duffey was born in Canada. As of 1884, he was a member of the Odd Fellows in Santa Cruz.

It was initially unclear whether Duffey had won the 1902 election against his opponent Harry S. Wanzer. A committee of the legislature later determined that Wanzer had won the election. A report at the time stated that the vote was on "straight party" lines. Wanzer, although he was declared the winner and took his seat on February 10, 1903, resigned just a month later, on March 16, 1903.

Representing area 54, he was a member of the Democratic Party and won re-election in 1912.

References

External links
 Andrew Duffey Family Tree
 Join California Andrew Duffey

1842 births
1919 deaths
Democratic Party members of the California State Assembly
Canadian emigrants to the United States
20th-century American politicians